The Olympus Pen E-P1 announced on 16 June 2009 is Olympus Corporation's first camera that adheres to the Micro Four Thirds (MFT) system design standard. The first camera to use the Micro Four Thirds mount was Panasonic's G-1 camera.

Features
The design of the camera is reminiscent of the Olympus Pen half frame film cameras and is marketed as the Olympus digital PEN. The model presented on 16 June 2009 was very similar in looks to the Olympus Pen F. Initially, two micro 4/3 lenses were available from Olympus, one 14–42 mm f/3.5–5.6 zoom and a 17 mm f/2.8 pancake prime lens.  Remarkably, with the exception of the optical viewfinder, the E-P1 seemed to fit most of the features found on the Olympus E-620, a larger Four Thirds system DSLR, into the small, compact MFT form factor.

In addition to Micro Four Thirds lenses, Olympus offers adapters allowing the use of Four Thirds lenses, or OM Zuiko lenses originally manufactured for use on the classic OM series of film SLR cameras that Olympus was famed for years ago.

The E-P1 does not have a built-in optical or electronic viewfinder, but instead uses the large  inch color "HyperCrystal" LCD on the back of the camera.  The fixed LCD panel with anti-reflective coating presents a 100% live preview of the image as seen by the sensor.  Olympus did offer an optional accessory hotshoe mounted optical viewfinder, the VF-1, that provided for a 17 mm lens angle of view

The E-P1 auto focuses using contrast-detection.

Other features include 720P30 video recording with the ability to process the video in camera with different effects.

In an interview, Mr Akira Watanabe, SLR Planning Department Manager for Olympus Imaging, said that for a number of reasons Micro Four Thirds was developed to meet the demands of those who wanted a DSLR, but without the size problems that come with one.

The 17 mm f/2.8 pancake lens or the 14–42 mm f/3.5–5.6 zoom lens are of the Micro Four Thirds lens mount which means they are smaller than Four Thirds lenses which require an adapter to fit the Micro Four Thirds body.

Several third-party manufacturers offer adapters for lenses of virtually all single-lens reflex and rangefinder systems, plus some cinema lenses.

Comparison with Panasonic Lumix DMC-G1 

At the time of the announcement of the Olympus E-P1, there was one other Micro Four Thirds camera on the market, the Panasonic Lumix DMC-G1. The two cameras materialize two very different concept, but both are built around a Four Thirds sized sensor and the Micro Four Thirds lens mount.

The Panasonic G1's body is SLR-style, with the bump on the top of the camera, where the pentaprism is placed in SLR's, in the G1, it houses the electronic viewfinder. the E-P1 does not have one, so it is almost flat, which makes it a rangefinder-style mirrorless camera.

It is not only the styling though, the G1's ergonomics and handling are more like a DSLR camera. It has a much larger grip and dials and switches on the top, on the grip and a lot of buttons on the back and the top laid out loosely. The E-P1 has a smaller grip and a much tighter button layout. It has non-conventional controlling methods, like the mode dial, which is sunk in the top panel and controlled through the back, or one of the back dials, which is placed where usually the thumb is rested during the use of the camera.

The E-P1 has a premium aluminium construction, the G1 is made out of plastic.

In terms of features, the E-P1 offers more, which is not surprising, considering it started on $899 instead of $699. The E-P1 has a built-in 3 axis sensor stabilization system and video recording capabilities, 6400 maximum ISO, the G1 does not have any of these. However, the G1 has an adjustable angle display, an electronic viewfinder and a built-in flash.

Successor models 

The E-P1 was replaced by the Olympus PEN E-P2 which was announced in November 2009 and complemented by the low-end Olympus PEN E-PL1.

References

External links 

 .

Reviews 
 
 .

Pen E-P1
Live-preview digital cameras
Cameras introduced in 2009